Sourton is a small village and civil parish in West Devon, England. It is at the north-western extremity of Dartmoor, a National Park of England and Wales, and lies along the A386 road. The historic map of Sourton shows that it is located near a river and the Sourton forest this can be seen in the image below. According to the 2001 census Sourton parish had a population of 406, and according to the 2011 census it had a population of 420. There is a public house in Sourton. In the 1870s Sourton was described as

One of Sourton's main tourist attractions is the Highwayman Inn which was built in 1812. In 1959 the inn was transformed into a fairy-tale and Aladdin's cave; this included the old Launceston to Tavistock coach being installed as the entrance to the inn. The main reason for the Highwayman Inn being a tourist attraction is due to the claims that it is the most haunted inn in Britain.

Housing
Many of the houses in Sourton are bungalows with a count of 191 or detached households with a count of 146. This is typical of a small village parish. This also is supported by the occupations in Sourton showing that the income in the area fits with the fact that there are very few terraced houses which make up a total of 9 houses in Sourton. the majority of houses in Sourton are owned outright with very few council houses or rented houses recorded on the 2011 data set. The average number of rooms per house in Sourton is 5 or more. The number of houses in Sourton decreased from 135 in 1841 to just 86 in 1901 which is consistent with the decrease in population it then increases to 105 houses in 1931.

Occupations
From the 1881 occupational data that is available the main occupation was in agriculture with around 75 men working in agriculture, showing that the occupation within agriculture was dominated by the male workforce. However, the majority of the female work force in 1881 is unknown or within the domestic services which would have been the typical role of the female in this time period. From the data that is available in 2001, the average distance that people travelled to work was 10 km with the majority of people remote working. The main occupation in 2001 was in the skilled trade which was mainly related to agriculture. However, there are more people within managers, senior officials and professionals within the technical occupations. In 2011 there is an increase in skilled jobs with a higher number of people working as managing directors and senior officials and with fewer people working with agriculture showing that Sourton has changed from an agriculture workforce to a more skilled and higher paid occupations. Also from the 2001 data available the majority of occupations are full-time with the average person working between 30-60hours a week.

Population
Sourton has a population density of 0.12hectare. The majority of Sourtons population is mainly dominated by the older population with 233 people aged between 45 and 75 years old with only 103 people aged between 20 and 44 this was the recorded figure in 2001 this gives a sense that there is an ageing population  this is also supported by the fact that there are only 62 dependants in Sourton according to the data available from the 2001 census data indicating that the area is attractive to an older population.
 The graph shows there is a population drop between 1841 and 1891 this could be due to a boundary change. Within 1901 the population had levelled out to around 400 up until 2011 where it has started to increase slightly. From the 2011 data available the main ethnic group is White:Irish/British with the main religion in Sourton being Christian

References

External links

Villages in the Borough of West Devon
Civil parishes in Devon
Dartmoor